The 1929–30 season was the 3rd season of competitive football in the British Mandate for Palestine under the Eretz Israel Football Association.

IFA Competitions

1930 Palestine Cup

The Third Palestine Cup was won by the reserve team of Maccabi Tel Aviv (which was in fact Maccabi first team), who had beaten  a Northamptonshire Regiment XI 2–1in the final.